Transmission Arts, also sometimes known as Radio art, are defined "as a multiplicity of practices and media working with the idea of transmission or the physical properties of the Electromagnetic spectrum (radio). Transmission works often manifest themselves in participatory live art or time-based art, and include, but are not limited to, sound, video, light, installation, and performance."

By their very nature, transmission artworks engage the public, and respond to radio and broadcast histories and materials. Organizations such as Wave Farm facilitate artist exploration of transmission-based creativity.

See also 
 Audium (theater)
 Acoustic ecology
 Broadcasting
 Electronic music
 Fluxus
 Installation art
 Intermedia
 List of sound artists
 NIME
 Noise Music
 Performance art
 Radio art
 Slow-scan television
 Sonification
 Sound art
 Sound installation 
 Sound map
 Sound poetry
 Sound sculpture
 Soundscape
 Soundscape ecology
 Visual music

References 

New media art